During the 2003–04 season, Walsall participated in the Football League First Division.

Season summary
Walsall started the season strongly with 4–1 wins over local rivals West Bromwich Albion and Nottingham Forest, and on Boxing Day were four points off the play-offs. However, the club's form slumped in 2004, with the club not picking up another league win until March. Manager Colin Lee was sacked on 16 April, though the official reason given was that Lee had contacted Plymouth Argyle regarding their managerial vacancy. Paul Merson was appointed temporary player-manager, assisted by fellow player Simon Osborn. Ultimately, Walsall would be relegated on the last day of the season despite a 3–2 win over Rotherham United: an extra two goals scored during the campaign would have been enough for them to climb above Gillingham to safety. Despite the sorry end to the campaign, Paul Merson was handed a permanent contract as manager.

Defender Paul Ritchie was named as the club's Player of the Season, but returned to Scotland to play for Dundee United at the end of the season.

Final league table

Players

First-team squad
Squad at end of season

Left club during season

Transfers

In
 Paul Merson - Portsmouth
 Simon Osborn - Gillingham, 3 July
 Stefan Oakes - Leicester City, 3 July
 Paul Ritchie - Manchester City, August, free

Notes

References

Walsall F.C. seasons
Walsall